Badinogo is a village in the Kongoussi Department of Bam Province in northern Burkina Faso. It lies to the west of Kongoussi.  It has a population of 297. It is sometimes listed as Badinogo-2 to distinguish it from the larger village Badinogo-1 which lies north of Kongoussi.

References

External links
Satellite map at Maplandia.com

Populated places in the Centre-Nord Region
Bam Province